Qırılı (also, Kyryly) is a village and municipality in the Agstafa Rayon of Azerbaijan.  It has a population of 3,810.

References 

Populated places in Aghstafa District